Clare Christina Moore is an Australian musician, songwriter, arranger, producer and performer whose principal instrument is the drums. She has also performed as a keyboard player, singer and vibraphone player. Moore writes and performs with songwriter and performer Dave Graney, involved in various bands including The Moodists, Dave Graney 'n' the Coral Snakes, the Dave Graney Show, the Lurid Yellow Mist featuring Dave Graney and Clare Moore and Dave Graney & the mistLY. 

She also wrote, sang and performed and released an album as part of The Dames, a band she formed with Kaye Louise Patterson (piano) and since 2018, with The Routines, a band with Jane Dust, Emily Jarrett and Will Hindmarsh].

History
Moore began performing in 1974, playing drums at school and at Rock Mass, in Adelaide. The Moodists first recorded two singles and a 12"EP for Au Go Go Records in Melbourne before going to the UK in October 1983 after being signed by Red Flame Records, touring extensively in Europe and the USA. 
The Moodists returned to Australia in 1985 after a short tour of the US to tour nationally opening for Public Image Ltd. They then returned to the UK and released a 12"single on Creation Records and with David McClymont - formerly of Postcard Records band Orange Juice -  joining on bass, they released two further EP's on Tim records. The band lineup at their end in late 1986 was Clare Moore on drums, David McClymont on bass, Steve Miller on guitar and Dave Graney on vocals. In 1987, singer Dave Graney decided to pursue a solo career and, with Moore as his music director, formed Dave Graney and The Coral Snakes and recorded an EP for Fire Records produced by Barry Adamson before returning to Australia in late 1988. In Melbourne In the following five or six years they worked with Universal Records, for whom they recorded four albums, then continued independently with Dave Graney & the mistLY.

Moore also plays drums in Harry Howard and the NDE and the Routines.

Moore released her first solo album The Third Woman in 2001. 
In 2005 there was also the double album Hashish and Liquor with Graney. Working with Graney, Moore co-wrote the soundtrack to the Tony Martin film Bad Eggs.

Other soundtrack work includes various ABC documentaries, the short film Ray by Tony Mahony, and the features Johnny Ghost and Lost Gully Road.

In 2010, Moore worked on the Arts Centre project about Australian female musicians called Rock Chicks.

In 2011 Clare Moore composed and recorded the theme for TV series A Quiet Word With .... by Tony Martin.

Discography

Studio albums

Soundtracks

Live albums

Awards and nominations

ARIA Music Awards
The ARIA Music Awards are a set of annual ceremonies presented by Australian Recording Industry Association (ARIA), which recognise excellence, innovation, and achievement across all genres of the music of Australia. They commenced in 1987. 

! 
|-
| 2003 || Music from the Motion Picture – Bad Eggs (Dave Graney and Clare Moore) || ARIA Award for Best Original Soundtrack, Cast or Show Album ||  ||

References

Australian musicians
Living people
Year of birth missing (living people)
Australian music arrangers
Australian people of Greek descent